John Foot or John Foote may refer to:

 John Foot, Baron Foot (1909–1999), English politician, member of the Foot family
 John Foot (historian) (born 1964), English academic, great-nephew of the above 
 John Alfred Foot (1803–1891), American politician  
 John Weir Foote (1904–1988), Canadian military chaplain
 John H. Foote (born 1959), Canadian film critic
 John J. Foote (1816–1905), American merchant and politician